

Offseason 
 October 3, 1978: Larvell Blanks and Jim Kern were traded by the Indians to the Texas Rangers for Len Barker and Bobby Bonds.
 December 5, 1978: Carmen Castillo was drafted by the Indians from the Philadelphia Phillies in the 1978 minor league draft.
 December 6, 1978: Cardell Camper was traded by the Indians to the Philadelphia Phillies for Joe Charboneau.

Regular season

Season standings

Record vs. opponents

Notable transactions 
 June 5, 1979: Von Hayes was drafted by the Indians in the 7th round of the 1979 Major League Baseball Draft. Player signed August 24, 1979.
 July 18, 1979: Mike Stanton was signed as a free agent by the Indians.

Opening Day Lineup

Roster

Player stats

Batting
Note: G = Games played; AB = At bats; R = Runs scored; H = Hits; 2B = Doubles; 3B = Triples; HR = Home runs; RBI = Runs batted in; AVG = Batting average; SB = Stolen bases

Pitching
Note: W = Wins; L = Losses; ERA = Earned run average; G = Games pitched; GS = Games started; SV = Saves; IP = Innings pitched; R = Runs allowed; ER = Earned runs allowed; BB = Walks allowed; K = Strikeouts

Awards and honors 
Andre Thornton, Roberto Clemente Award
All-Star Game

Farm system

Notes

References 
1979 Cleveland Indians team page at Baseball Reference
1979 Cleveland Indians team page at www.baseball-almanac.com

Cleveland Guardians seasons
Cleveland Indians season
Cleve